Lloyd Doesburg (29 April 1960 – 7 June 1989 in Paramaribo) was a Surinamese football goalkeeper. During his career he served Elinkwijk, Vitesse, Excelsior Rotterdam and Ajax. He died at the age of 29, when on 7 June 1989 he was killed in the Surinam Airways Flight PY764 air crash in Paramaribo.

Club career
Doesburg lived in Lelystad and played his first professional football matches for Elinkwijk where he played until 1981. After this he was transferred to Vitesse where he played a total of five seasons before joining Excelsior. From August 1987 he was purchased by Ajax to become their second goalkeeper behind Stanley Menzo after Fred Grim left the club. In total he would play five matches in the first team of Ajax.

Personal life

Death

He was invited by Sonny Hasnoe, the founder of the Colourful 11 to be part of the team and travel to Suriname to play in the "Boxel Kleurrijk Tournament" with three Surinamese teams. Team mates Stanley Menzo and Henny Meijer were told to stay with their club, but ignored these demands and went as well, but both took an earlier flight. The Surinam Airways Flight PY764 crashed during approach to Paramaribo-Zanderij International Airport, killing 176 of the 187 on board, including Doesburg, making it the worst ever aviation disaster in Suriname's history. Among the dead were a total of 15 members of the Colourful 11, only three of them survived.

Doesburg's funeral was on 22 June 1989 and the complete Ajax squad of these days were present, including Menzo, Henny Meijer, Jan Wouters, Aron Winter, Danny Blind, Bryan Roy, Dennis Bergkamp, Frank de Boer and Ronald de Boer who carried the coffin.

References

External links
 Geheugen van Oost 
 Doesburg at AndroKnel.nl 
 Crash report
 Iwan Tol: Eindbesteming Zanderij; het vergeten verhaal van het Kleurrijk Elftal 

1960 births
1989 deaths
Sportspeople from Paramaribo
Footballers from Lelystad
Surinamese footballers
Dutch footballers
Surinamese emigrants to the Netherlands
Association football goalkeepers
USV Elinkwijk players
SBV Vitesse players
Excelsior Rotterdam players
AFC Ajax players
Eerste Divisie players
Eredivisie players
Footballers killed in the Surinam Airways Flight 764 crash